The Motorised Submersible Canoe (MSC), nicknamed Sleeping Beauty, was built by the British Special Operations Executive (SOE) during World War II as an underwater vehicle for a single frogman to perform clandestine reconnaissance or attacks against enemy vessels.

Design
The MSC was designed by Major Hugh Reeves, R.E., who was also given the task of designing an 'unspecified device' for an underwater approach.  based on an idea from Lt Col "Blondie" Hasler  which he called the 'underwater glider' and developed at Aston House to Hasler's specifications. The craft got its nickname "Sleeping Beauty" when Reeves was found sleeping in it by a passing officer.

Fore and central trimming tanks within the hull can be flooded to sink the craft underwater or have compressed air blown in them to surface the craft. The pilot controlled the craft by a joystick that is connected to the rudder and diving planes, breathed through a Siebe Gorman Salvus MkII Amphibian rebreather or Dunlop Underwater Swimming Breathing Apparatus (UWSBA), and would have to come close to the surface to establish his whereabouts. The canoe can also be paddled or moved by raising the mast and setting a sail. Although the Sleeping Beauty was designed to accommodate only one pilot, a later model did attempt to produce a two-man version post war. Different configurations were tried on the MSC such as the positioning of the hydroplanes; these were positioned aft, but sometimes moved forward during experimental work. The High Pressure air tanks (H.P.) could afford four blows to the surface from 40 ft and up to 20 blows to the surface from 15 ft. 

During the end of 1943 the MSC was referred to the "Assault Warfare Sub Committee" (AWSC) and had trials conducted at Queen Mary Reservoir. There the MSC was compared with the Chariot manned torpedo and Welman submarine. The MSC was found to be small (up to 15 canoes could be carried in a larger submarine's torpedo storage compartment), light, easier to navigate, simple to operate, and quick to build. However, the craft was very difficult to control.

Operation
The MSC's usual method of operations was "porpoising" in quick rises to the surface to check bearings, then shallow diving. This manoeuvre required the pilot to put the bow of the Sleeping Beauty to the water's surface and watch the reflection of it underneath the surface, and just when the bow was about to meet with its reflected image the Sleeping Beauty would be put into a dive so that the pilot's head would come out of the water and he was able to see his direction.

The pilot could leave the Sleeping Beauty to swim and plant limpet mines on enemy ships, rather than piloting the MSC to the target directly.

Operational service
MSCs were also used for Operation Rimau, a raid on Japanese shipping in Singapore in September 1944 by commandos from the joint Australian, British and New Zealand Z Special Unit, sometimes known as "Z Force". After being found by a patrol boat, the canoes had to be scuttled along with the junk in which they were carried. Ten of the attacking force were taken prisoner by the Japanese and subsequently beheaded.

A pair of MSCs are believed to have been captured by German forces after an unsuccessful attack on enemy shipping in Måløy by members of the Norwegian Independent Company 1.  The divers were landed with their canoes on the nearby island of Gangsøy.  However, a local shepherd girl saw them and, thinking that they were thieving Germans, she reported them to the authorities.  The divers were then chased across Norway by the Germans until they were picked up safely and taken back to their base in the Shetland Islands.

In the summer of 1944, "Sleeping Beauty Number 72" was delivered to the United States Office of Strategic Services (OSS), the forerunner of the CIA, and became the early prototype for today's Swimmer Delivery Vehicle.  It was used from December 1944 to August 1945 to evaluate United States harbour defences, stage mock attacks on capital ships and develop underwater communications equipment.

UCWE Trials Report on Sleeping Beauty

In November 1954, the Clearance Diving Trials Team attached to the Admiralty's Underwater Countermeasures and Weapons Establishment (UCWE) at Leigh Park House near Havant in Hampshire issued a report on the Sleeping Beauty, signed off by the Officer-in-Charge of the team, Lt Cdr Gordon Gutteridge RN:

Gallery

References

Citations

Bibliography
 
 
 .

External links 
 Report on background and maritime archaeological survey for a Motorised Submersible Canoe (MSC) or ‘Sleeping Beauty’ lost 1945, HMAS Stirling, Careening Bay, Cockburn Sound  Maritime Archaeology Databases
 News Archive 25 mcdoa.org.uk
 Sleeping Beauty – The Underwater Heritage Trust
 British Special Operations Executive (SOE): Tools and Gadgets Gallery BBC History World Wars:

Midget submarines
World War II submarines of the United Kingdom
Wet subs
British inventions